The Liga Handebol Brasil feminina 2019 (2019 Women's Brazil Handball League) was the 23rd season of the top tier Brazilian handball national competitions for clubs, it is organized by the Brazilian Handball Confederation. For the 2nd time EC Pinheiros was crowned champion winning the final against UNIP São Bernardo.

Teams qualified for the play-offs
South Southeast Conference
 EC Pinheiros
 UNIP São Bernardo
 UnC Concórdia
 Blumenau FURB
Northeastern Conference
 Clube Português
Central west Conference
 Força Atlética

Play-offs

Group A

Group B

5th place match

Bronze medal match

Final

References

External links
CBHb official web site

Bra